Fernandoz is a Swedish dansband formed in 1986 in Vitsand, near Torsby. They had a big hit in 1991 entitled with the song "Jag vet att jag vill ha dig". The band won the "svenska dansbandsmästare" award in 1993 and they started appearing on the popular television program Bingolotto, for a number of times. Their most recognized hits include "Guld och gröna skogar", "En dag den sommaren", "När ett hjärta har älskat" Band guitarist Conny Ohlson and singer Anders Nordlund have won a Swedish Grammy "Guldklaven" for their work.

Members
Because of its long existence, the band has seen many changes. 

Present members are:
Anders Nordlund (1990-) - Solo singer, bass, guitar, accordion
Tom Manninen (2004-) - Saxophone, guitar, vocals
Kevin B. Nordlund (augusti 2010-) - Keyboards, accordion, vocals
Thomas Wikström (2011-) - Drums, vocals

Earlier members included:
Stefan Olsson - Guitar (1986 - 1997)
Erik Strandberg - Keyboards, accordion (1986 - 1990)
Peter Stolpe - Bass (1986 - 1990)
Lars "i vika" Olsson - Drums, vocals (1986 - 1990)
Christer Strandberg - Guitar, vocals (1986 - 1987)
Lars-Inge Bergström - Guitar, vocals (1987 - 1989)
Karl-Olof Werner - Saxophone, guitar, vocals (1989 - 2004)
Per-Olov Olsson - Keyboards, accordion, saxophone, vocals (1991 - 1998)
Martin Säfström - Drums, vocals (1991 - 1992)
Mikael Kvarnlöv - Drums (1992 - 1998)
Kenneth Herrgård - Keyboards, accordion, saxophone, vocals (1998 - 2007)
Peter Månsson - Drums (1998 - 2001)
J-O Ekström - Drums, vocals (2001 - 2002)
Robert Eriksson - Drums (2002 - 2003)
Mattias Berghorn - Drums, vocals (2003 - 2005)
Göran Landberg - Drums (2005 - 2006)
Conny Haglund - Keyboards (2007 - 2008)
Git Persson - Accordion, vocals (2007 - 2009)
Svante Gustavsson - Keyboards, accordion, vocals (2009 - 2010)
Conny Ohlson - Guitar, steel guitar (1997 - 2011)
Conny Falk - Drummer, vocals (2006 - 2011)

Discography

Albums
Studio and live albums

Compilation albums
1995: Mitt liv med dig
1998: När ett hjärta har älskat
2002: En dag den sommaren
2006: Maria Therese
2008: Mest av allt - Fernandoz bästa låtar (Reached number 56 in Swedish Albums Chart)
2009: Upp till dans 11 (Expressens dansbandssatsning 2009)

Singles
1993: "Jag vill ha dig" / "Stand by Me" / "Café Nostalgi" / "What a Wonderful World"
1993: "Radio Luxemburg/Elvis Medley"
1994: "Våga tro på kärleken" / "The Great Pretender" / "Härliga lördag"
1994: "Dina ögon svarar ja" / "Det är dig jag tänker på"
1996: "När alla vindarna vänder" / "Stuck on You"
2000: "Störst av allt är kärleken" / "I kväll så ska det hända"
2001: "Tomma löften" / "Far och son i okänt land"
2001: "Stjärnor ska tändas i natt" / "Rock'N'Roll Crazy"
2003: "Vem får din kärlek i natt" / "I natt jag drömde"

Svensktoppen songs
1995: "Dina ögon svarar ja"
1995: "Mitt liv med dej" with Christina Lindberg
1997: "När alla vindarna vänder"
1997: "När ett hjärta har älskat"
1998-9: "Guld och gröna skogar"
1999: "En dag den sommaren"
1999: "Midnight Rendez-Vous"
2000: "Störst av allt är kärleken"
2001: "Tomma löften"
2002: "Stjärnor ska tändas i natt
Non-charting
1994: "Våga tro på kärleken"
1997: "Livets källa"
2008: "En helt ny dag"

References

External links
Official website

Dansbands
Musical groups established in 1986
1986 establishments in Sweden